Stanislaus Tobias Magombo (24 February 1968 – 6 July 2010) was the Roman Catholic titular bishop of Caesarea in Mauretania and auxiliary bishop of the Roman Catholic Diocese of Lilongwe, Malawi.

Ordained to the priesthood on 3 August 1996 for the Roman Catholic Diocese of Dedza, Malawi, Magombo was named auxiliary bishop of the Lilongwe Diocese on 29 April 2009 and was ordained bishop on 11 July 2009.

See also

Notes

21st-century Roman Catholic bishops in Malawi
1968 births
2010 deaths
Roman Catholic bishops of Lilongwe
Malawian Roman Catholic bishops